Bazaria lixiviella is a species of snout moth in the genus Bazaria. It was described by Nikolay Grigoryevich Erschoff in 1874. It is found in Iran, Pakistan, the Palestinian territories and the United Arab Emirates.

References

Moths described in 1874
Phycitini
Moths of Asia